Algicola is a genus in the phylum Pseudomonadota (Bacteria).

Etymology
The name Algicola derives from Latin alga, a seaweed, and cola or incola, an inhabitant or dweller; Algicola, then, means inhabitant of algae.

Species
The genus contains two species:
 A. bacteriolytica Sawabe et al. 1998. Ivanova et al. 2004  (type species of the genus); bacterium, rod or staff and  lytica (from Greek lutikē, able to loosen, able to dissolve, to give bacteriolytica, bacteria-dissolving
 A. sagamiensis Kobayashi et al. 2003, Nam et al. 2007, sagamiensis, referring to Sagami Bay, the place of isolation

See also
 Bacterial taxonomy
 Microbiology

References 

Bacteria genera
Alteromonadales